Ridgeville Corners is an unincorporated community and census-designated place (CDP) in southern Ridgeville Township, Henry County, Ohio, United States. It has a post office with the ZIP code 43555. The population was 435 at the 2010 census.

History
Ridgeville Corners was laid out at an unknown date as an early trading point of Ridgeville Township. The First Congregational Church in Ridgeville Corners was a stop on the Underground Railroad in the mid-1800s. A post office has been in operation at Ridgeville Corners since 1841.

Geography

As its name suggests, Ridgeville Corners sits on high ground, with the northwest side draining towards the Tiffin River, a south-flowing tributary of the Maumee River, and the southeast side of the community draining directly to the Maumee.

Demographics

Gallery

References

Census-designated places in Henry County, Ohio
Census-designated places in Ohio